Mathew Wilkinson  (born 9 November 1976) is an Australian film and television actor. Wilkinson played Abigor in the 2007 film Ghost Rider. He played the role of Rocket in the 1999 winner of the Australian Film Institute Award for Best Film, Two Hands, and in 2000 made his Hollywood debut in the action film Mission: Impossible 2. Wilkinson has also appeared in the movie Storm Warning as Brett.

Filmography
Two Hands (1999) – Rocket
Sample People (2000) – Gus
Mission: Impossible 2 (2000) – Michael
White Collar Blue (2002) (TV series, 1 episode) – Paul Gill 
Liquid Bridge (2003) – Frank
Dope (2003) – Jim
Stealth (2005) – EDI Technician
Ghost Rider (2007) – Abigor
Storm Warning (2007) – Brett

External links

Living people
Australian male film actors
Australian male television actors
1976 births